Sari Daraq (also Romanized as Sārī Daraq) is a village in Qeshlaq Rural District, Abish Ahmad District, Kaleybar County, East Azerbaijan Province, Iran. At the 2006 census, its population was 124, in 28 families.

References 

Populated places in Kaleybar County